Christiane Schmidtmer (24 December 1939 – 13 March 2003) was a German actress, fashion model, nude model, and memoirist.

Biography

Early life

Christiane Schmidtmer was born in Mannheim, Germany, to Gertrud and Jakob Schmidtmer on Christmas Eve 1939. She took acting lessons in Munich and worked in the stage in Germany for around 4 years (1961-1963), then Christiane turned to photographic modeling for several German pornographic magazine and later, Playboy. Before acting in the movie, she also modeled for advertising companies, namely Max Factor cosmetics. Her father disappeared in Russia during the war. The family later relocated from Mannheim to nearby Heidelberg after her mother remarried.

At the age of 17, her mother sent her to London, where Christiane attended St Giles School to learn English. During her stay in England, she met a powerful man of British royalty, who offered to send her to the Royal Academy of Arts if – in return – she would sleep with him. She packed her bags and left for Germany the same night. After returning to Heidelberg, she attended the local Hölderlin-Gymnasium (academic high school) from which she graduated during the late 1950s.

In 1959 against strong family opposition – her mother wanted her to follow a career in medicine – Christiane Schmidtmer moved to Munich, where she began taking acting lessons. During that time, she performed in afternoon stage productions for children.

Career

Schmidtmer worked onstage in Germany from 1961–63, then turned to photographic modelling for German fashion and nude magazines and later, Playboy in the USA. She modelled for advertising companies, namely Max Factor Cosmetics, before she started her movie career. She was hired as their featured model and introduced at the New York World's Fair in 1964 followed by an American tour with visits to Los Angeles, Las Vegas, and Chicago. After her return to Los Angeles, she met  polyglot language teacher and publisher Michel Thomas for the first time in August 1965 at the Chateau Marmont Hotel. The two began a long love relationship a short time later.

She appeared in German TV and movie productions, such as Rolf Hädrich's Stop Train 349. During the filming in Berlin and England, she befriended co-star José Ferrer. The friendship lasted until Ferrer's death in 1992. He later recommended her to Stanley Kramer for his production of Ship of Fools, her first US film in which she played Ferrer's beautiful mistress. She played the evil prison wardress in The Big Doll House (1971) and Lufthansa stewardess Lise Bruner in Boeing Boeing.

Schmidtmer was one of just a few German actresses successful in 1960s Hollywood, and was praised by critics as the most exciting German import since Marlene Dietrich. Schmidtmer, with her attractive and typically German appearance, was often reduced to playing the "attractive German". Her nickname which stuck throughout her career was "Liebesbombe"/"Love Bomb".

Throughout the 1970s and towards the end of her career, Schmidtmer appeared in numerous US talk shows, television series, and B-movie productions such as The Giant Spider Invasion (1975).  In 1981, she appeared in Hot Bubblegum - Lemon Popsicle 3 - one of the sequels in the Israeli Eskimo Limon series. Most sources list this as her last film; in it she portrayed a nymphomaniac piano teacher.

Schmidtmer continued to do commercials and voiceover work in a number of productions.

Later years and death

Following her movie career, Schmidtmer worked as a licensed real estate agent in Southern California. She lived both in the US and Heidelberg. In 1980, shortly before ending her movie career, she published her autobiography My Wild Nights in Hollywood in German magazines, which detailed her claimed affairs with many actors, including a relationship with Glenn Ford. It was later translated into several languages. During that time, she lived in Munich-Schwabing.

In 1995, Schmidtmer permanently moved back to Germany. She led a quiet life, but her own health started to fail. Schmidtmer died in her sleep on 13 March 2003 at her home in Heidelberg, Germany, from natural causes following an accident. Schmidtmer is interred at the family grave in Heidelberg-Handschuhsheim.

Filmography
Geld sofort (1961, TV Short) as die Sekretärin
Ein Todesfall wird vorbereitet (1963, TV movie) as Sandra Williams
Stop Train 349 (1963) as Karin
Hafenpolizei (1963, TV Series) as Hannelore
Fanny Hill (1964) as Fiona
Sechs Stunden Angst (1964, TV movie) as Carla de la Osta
 (1965) as Miranda (uncredited)
Ship of Fools (1965) as Lizzi
Boeing Boeing (1965) as Lise Bruner / Lufthansa
Blue Light (1966, TV series) as Erika von Lindendorf
The Wild Wild West (1966, TV Series) as Lucretia Ivronin
12 O'Clock High (1966, TV series) as Frieda von Heurtzel
I Deal in Danger (1966) as Erika von Lindendorf
Hogan's Heroes (1968, TV series) as Heidi Baum
Our Doctor is the Best (1969) as Frau Janssen
The Most Deadly Game (1970, TV Series) as Bettina
The Big Doll House (1971) as Miss Dietrich
Scream, Pretty Peggy (1973, TV movie) as Jennifer Elliot
Police Story (1974-1976, TV series) as Lynn / Hilda
Airport 1975 (1974) as Angie Bell - Passenger (uncredited)
The Specialist (1975) as Nude Model
Half a House (1975) as Gina
The Giant Spider Invasion (1975) as Helga (wrongly credited as Christiana Schmidtmer)
Wonder Woman (1977, TV Series) as Lisa Engel
Star Struck (1978, short) as Kimberly Shaw
Half a House (1979) as Gina
Hot Bubblegum (1981) as Fritzi (final film role)

References

Sources
 Biodata, lifeinlegacy.com

External links
 
 

1939 births
2003 deaths
20th-century German actresses
German television actresses
German female models
German film actresses
Actors from Heidelberg
Actors from Mannheim
Actresses from California
German expatriates in the United Kingdom
20th-century American actresses
21st-century American women